Magomed Magomedvich Kurbanaliev (born 6 August 1992) is a Russian freestyle wrestler of Avar Dagestani descent. He is 2016 World Freestyle Wrestling Champion in 70 kg. He competes in the 66 kg division and won the gold medal in the same division at the 2013 Summer Universiade defeating David Safaryan of Armenia. Also he won bronze at the 2013 World Wrestling Championships in Budapest. At the Golden Grand Prix Ivan Yarygin 2016 he resigned after in the final due to his knee injury. He went on winning the World Military Championships in 2016. Recently he won the Golden Grand Prix Ivan Yarygin 2018.

References

1992 births
Living people
People from Dagestan
Russian male sport wrestlers
World Wrestling Championships medalists
Universiade medalists in wrestling
Universiade gold medalists for Russia
European Wrestling Championships medalists
Medalists at the 2013 Summer Universiade
Sportspeople from Dagestan
20th-century Russian people
21st-century Russian people